Lunar distance may refer to:
 Lunar distance (astronomy), the distance between the Earth and the Moon.
 Lunar distance (navigation), a measurement used in the calculation of longitude.